The Canton of Auchel is one of the cantons of the Pas-de-Calais department, in northern France. At the French canton reorganisation which came into effect in March 2015, the canton was reduced from 10 to 9 communes.

It consists of the following communes: 

Auchel 
Calonne-Ricouart
Camblain-Châtelain
Cauchy-à-la-Tour
Diéval
Divion
Lozinghem
Marles-les-Mines
Ourton

References

Auchel